The International Mechanical Code (IMC) is a convention concentrating on the safety of heating, ventilation, and air conditioning systems. It is published by the International Code Council (ICC) through the governmental consensus process and is updated on a three-year cycle to include the latest advances in technology and safest mechanical practices. The current version of this code is the 2018 edition. The IMC protects public health and safety for all building heating, cooling and ventilation related design, installation and inspection by providing minimum safeguards for people at homes, schools and workplace. Fuel burning appliances, cooling systems, heating systems appliance venting, location and protection of appliances and many other such issues are addressed in the IMC.

The IMC is the most widely used mechanical code in the United States and is also used as the basis for the mechanical code of several other countries.

See also
Uniform Mechanical Code

References

External links

Heating, ventilation, and air conditioning